The Tongan International Cricket  is the team that represents the Kingdom of Tonga in international cricket. They became an affiliate member of the International Cricket Council in 2000. They were removed as an affiliate member in June 2014, for failing to comply with membership requirements.

International competition

Tonga has taken part in four international tournaments between 2001 and 2005. In 2000 and 2001, they took part in the Pacifica Championship, finishing fourth in 2000, and as runners up in 2001. Their 2001 performance qualified them for the East Asia/Pacific Challenge tournament in 2004, a tournament that formed part of the qualification process for the 2007 World Cup. They lost to Fiji in the final of that tournament, just missing out on progressing to the next stage of qualification. In 2005, they set out on the road to qualification for the 2011 World Cup, playing in the East Asia/Pacific Cricket Cup, they finished fourth in the tournament, ending their hopes of qualification for the World Cup.

Matches 
Below is a record of international matches played in the one-day format by Tonga between 2001 and 2009.

References 

Cricket in Tonga
National cricket teams
Cricket
Tonga in international cricket